This is a list of the native wild mammal species recorded in Mexico. As of September 2014, there were 536 mammalian species or subspecies listed. Based on IUCN data, Mexico has 23% more noncetacean mammal species than the U.S. and Canada combined in an area only 10% as large, or a species density over 12 times that of its northern neighbors. Mexico's high mammal biodiversity is in part a reflection of the wide array of biomes present over its latitudinal, climatic and altitudinal ranges, from lowland tropical rainforest to temperate desert to montane forest to alpine tundra. The general increase in terrestrial biodiversity moving towards the equator is another important factor in the comparison. Mexico includes much of the Mesoamerican and Madrean pine-oak woodlands biodiversity hotspots. From a biogeographic standpoint, most of Mexico is linked to the rest of North America as part of the Nearctic realm. However, the lowlands of southern Mexico are linked with Central America and South America as part of the Neotropical realm. Extensive mixing of Nearctic and Neotropical mammal species commenced only three million years ago, when the formation of the Isthmus of Panama ended South America's long period of isolation and precipitated the Great American Interchange. Twenty of Mexico's extant nonflying species (opossums, armadillos, anteaters, monkeys and caviomorph rodents) are of South American origin. Most of the megafauna that formerly inhabited the region became extinct at the end of the Pleistocene about 10,000 years ago, shortly after the arrival of the first humans. Increasing alteration and destruction of natural habitats by expanding human populations during the last several centuries is causing further attrition of the region's biodiversity, as exemplified by the "hotspot" designations (by definition, such areas have lost over 70% of their primary vegetation).

The following tags are used to highlight each species' conservation status as assessed by the International Union for Conservation of Nature; those on the left are used here, those in the second column in some other articles:

Of the listed taxa, 7 are extinct, 1 (not recognized by the IUCN) is possibly extinct, 30 are critically endangered, 46 are endangered, 26 are vulnerable, and 23 are near threatened. These status tags were most recently updated in April 2011. Six of the extinct or possibly extinct taxa and 11 of the critically endangered taxa are insular (all but two of these are rodents); another 13 of the critically endangered species (all rodents or shrews) are montane. The only critically endangered species that are neither rodents nor shrews are the Cozumel Island raccoon and the vaquita. The vaquita population estimate has dropped below 100 as of 2014 and it is regarded as being in imminent danger of extinction.

Subclass: Theria

Infraclass: Metatheria

Order: Didelphimorphia (common opossums) 

Didelphimorphia is the order of common opossums of the Western Hemisphere. Opossums probably diverged from the basic South American marsupials in the late Cretaceous or early Paleocene. They are small to medium-sized marsupials, about the size of a large house cat, with a long snout and prehensile tail.

Family: Didelphidae (American opossums)
Subfamily: Caluromyinae
Genus: Caluromys
 Derby's woolly opossum, C. derbianus 
Subfamily: Didelphinae
Genus: Chironectes
 Water opossum, C. minimus 
Genus: Didelphis
 Common opossum, D. marsupialis 
 Virginia opossum, D. virginiana 
Genus: Marmosa
 Mexican mouse opossum, M. mexicana 
Genus: Metachirus
 Brown four-eyed opossum, M. nudicaudatus 
Genus: Philander
 Gray four-eyed opossum, P. opossum 
Genus: Tlacuatzin
 Grayish mouse opossum, T. canescens

Infraclass: Eutheria

Order: Sirenia (manatees and dugongs) 

Sirenia is an order of fully aquatic, herbivorous mammals that inhabit rivers, estuaries, coastal marine waters, swamps, and marine wetlands. All four species are endangered. They evolved about 50 million years ago, and their closest living relatives are elephants. Manatees are the only extant afrotherians in the Americas. However, a number proboscid species, some of which survived until the arrival of Paleo-Indians, once inhabited the region. Mammoths, mastodons and gomphotheres all formerly lived in Mexico.

Family: Trichechidae
Genus: Trichechus
 West Indian manatee, T. manatus

Order: Cingulata (armadillos) 

Armadillos are small mammals with a bony armored shell. Two of twenty-one extant species are present in Mexico; the remainder are only found in South America, where they originated. Their much larger relatives, the pampatheres and glyptodonts, once lived in North and South America but went extinct following the appearance of humans.

Family: Dasypodidae (long-nosed armadillos)
Subfamily: Dasypodinae
Genus: Dasypus
 Nine-banded armadillo, D. novemcinctus 
Family: Chlamyphoridae (armadillos)
Subfamily: Tolypeutinae
Genus: Cabassous
 Northern naked-tailed armadillo, C. centralis

Order: Pilosa (anteaters, sloths and tamanduas) 

The order Pilosa is extant only in the Americas and includes the anteaters, sloths, and tamanduas. Their ancestral home is South America. Numerous ground sloths, some of which reached the size of elephants, were once present in both North and South America, as well as on the Antilles, but all went extinct following the arrival of humans.

Suborder: Vermilingua
Family: Cyclopedidae
Genus: Cyclopes
 Common silky anteater, C. didactylus 
Central American silky anteater, C. dorsalis 
Family: Myrmecophagidae (American anteaters)
Genus: Tamandua
 Northern tamandua, T. mexicana

Order: Primates 

The order Primates includes the lemurs, monkeys, and apes, with the latter category including humans. It is divided into four main groupings: strepsirrhines, tarsiers, monkeys of the New World (parvorder Platyrrhini), and monkeys and apes of the Old World. Mexico's 2 genera of nonhuman primates compares to 6 in Central America, 20 in South America, 15 in Madagascar, 23 in Africa and 19 in Asia. Mexican and Central American monkeys are recent immigrants from South America, where their ancestors arrived after rafting over from Africa roughly 25 million years ago. Southeastern Mexico is the northernmost limit of the distribution of New World monkeys, which are restricted to tropical rainforest habitat.

Suborder: Haplorrhini
Infraorder: Simiiformes
Parvorder: Platyrrhini
Family: Atelidae
Subfamily: Alouattinae
Genus: Alouatta
 Mantled howler, A. palliata 
 Guatemalan black howler, A. pigra 
Subfamily: Atelinae
Genus: Ateles
 Geoffroy's spider monkey, A. geoffroyi

Order: Rodentia (rodents) 

Rodents make up the largest order of mammals, with over 40% of mammalian species. They have two incisors in the upper and lower jaw which grow continually and must be kept short by gnawing. According to the IUCN listing, Mexico has more rodent species (236 as of April 2011) than any other country in the world (Brazil is second with 222). Of Mexico's rodents, 2% are caviomorphs, 14.5% are sciurids, 25.5% are castorimorphs and 58% are cricetids. This distribution is fairly similar to that of the remainder of North America (although sciurids are relatively twice as abundant to the north, at the expense of cricetids), but is very different from that of South America, where the corresponding figures are 36%, 3%, 1% and 60%. Of Mexico's cricetids, 17% are sigmodontine, while the figure for South America is 99.5%. Mexico's caviomorphs are recent immigrants from South America, where their ancestors washed ashore after rafting across the Atlantic from Africa about 40–45 million years ago. Conversely, South America's sciurids, castorimorphs and cricetids are recent immigrants from Central America (with sigmodontines getting a head start on the others).

Suborder: Hystricomorpha
Family: Erethizontidae (New World porcupines)
Subfamily: Erethizontinae
Genus: Erethizon
 North American porcupine, E. dorsatum LC
Genus: Coendou
 Mexican hairy dwarf porcupine, Coendou mexicanus LC
Family: Dasyproctidae (agoutis and pacas)
Genus: Dasyprocta
 Mexican agouti, Dasyprocta mexicana CR
 Central American agouti, Dasyprocta punctata LC
Family: Cuniculidae
Genus: Cuniculus
 Lowland paca, Cuniculus paca LC
Suborder: Sciuromorpha
Family: Sciuridae (squirrels)
Subfamily: Sciurinae
Tribe: Pteromyini
Genus: Glaucomys
 Southern flying squirrel, Glaucomys volans LC
Tribe: Sciurini
Genus: Sciurus
 Abert's squirrel, Sciurus aberti LC
 Allen's squirrel, Sciurus alleni LC
 Arizona gray squirrel, Sciurus arizonensis DD
 Mexican gray squirrel, Sciurus aureogaster LC
 Collie's squirrel, Sciurus colliaei LC
 Deppe's squirrel, Sciurus deppei LC
 Western gray squirrel, Sciurus griseus LC
 Mexican fox squirrel, Sciurus nayaritensis LC
 Fox squirrel, Sciurus niger LC
 Peters's squirrel, Sciurus oculatus LC
 Variegated squirrel, Sciurus variegatoides LC
 Yucatan squirrel, Sciurus yucatanensis LC
Genus: Tamiasciurus
 Mearns's squirrel, Tamiasciurus mearnsi EN
Subfamily: Xerinae
Tribe: Marmotini
Genus: Ammospermophilus
 Harris's antelope squirrel, Ammospermophilus harrisii LC
 Espíritu Santo antelope squirrel, Ammospermophilus insularis 
 Texas antelope squirrel, Ammospermophilus interpres LC
 White-tailed antelope squirrel, Ammospermophilus leucurus LC
Genus: Cynomys
 Black-tailed prairie dog, Cynomys ludovicianus LC
 Mexican prairie dog, Cynomys mexicanus EN
Genus: Neotamias
 Buller's chipmunk, Neotamias bulleri VU
 Cliff chipmunk, Neotamias dorsalis LC
 Durango chipmunk, Neotamias durangae LC
 Merriam's chipmunk, Neotamias merriami LC
 California chipmunk, Neotamias obscurus LC
Genus: Spermophilus
 Tropical ground squirrel, Spermophilus adocetus LC
 Ring-tailed ground squirrel, Spermophilus annulatus LC
 Baja California rock squirrel, Spermophilus atricapillus EN
 California ground squirrel, Spermophilus beecheyi LC
 Sierra Madre ground squirrel, Spermophilus madrensis NT
 Mexican ground squirrel, Spermophilus mexicanus LC
 Perote ground squirrel, Xerospermophilus perotensis EN
 Spotted ground squirrel, Spermophilus spilosoma LC
 Round-tailed ground squirrel, Spermophilus tereticaudus LC
 Rock squirrel, Spermophilus variegatus LC
Suborder: Castorimorpha
Family: Castoridae (beavers)
Genus: Castor
 American beaver, Castor canadensis LC
Family: Geomyidae
Genus: Cratogeomys
 Yellow-faced pocket gopher, Cratogeomys castanops LC
 Oriental Basin pocket gopher, Cratogeomys fulvescens LC
 Smoky pocket gopher, Cratogeomys fumosus LC
 Goldman's pocket gopher, Cratogeomys goldmani LC
 Merriam's pocket gopher, Cratogeomys merriami LC
 Perote pocket gopher, Cratogeomys perotensis LC
 Flat-headed pocket gopher, Cratogeomys planiceps LC
Genus: Geomys
 Desert pocket gopher, Geomys arenarius NT
 Texas pocket gopher, Geomys personatus LC
 Tropical pocket gopher, Geomys tropicalis CR
Genus: Orthogeomys
 Oaxacan pocket gopher, Orthogeomys cuniculus DD
 Giant pocket gopher, Orthogeomys grandis LC
 Hispid pocket gopher, Orthogeomys hispidus LC
 Big pocket gopher, Orthogeomys lanius CR
Genus: Pappogeomys
 Alcorn's pocket gopher, Pappogeomys alcorni CR
 Buller's pocket gopher, Pappogeomys bulleri LC
Genus: Thomomys
 Botta's pocket gopher, Thomomys bottae LC
 Southern pocket gopher, Thomomys umbrinus LC
Genus: Zygogeomys
 Michoacan pocket gopher, Zygogeomys trichopus EN
Family: Heteromyidae
Subfamily: Dipodomyinae
Genus: Dipodomys
 Agile kangaroo rat, Dipodomys agilis LC
 Gulf Coast kangaroo rat, Dipodomys compactus LC
 Desert kangaroo rat, Dipodomys deserti LC
 San Quintin kangaroo rat, Dipodomys gravipes CR
 San Jose Island kangaroo rat, Dipodomys insularis CR
 Margarita Island kangaroo rat, Dipodomys margaritae CR
 Merriam's kangaroo rat, Dipodomys merriami LC
 Nelson's kangaroo rat, Dipodomys nelsoni LC
 Ord's kangaroo rat, Dipodomys ordii LC
 Phillips's kangaroo rat, Dipodomys phillipsii LC
 Dulzura kangaroo rat, Dipodomys simulans LC
 Banner-tailed kangaroo rat, Dipodomys spectabilis NT
Subfamily: Heteromyinae
Genus: Heteromys
 Desmarest's spiny pocket mouse, Heteromys desmarestianus LC
 Gaumer's spiny pocket mouse, Heteromys gaumeri LC
 Mexican spiny pocket mouse, Heteromys irroratus LC
 Nelson's spiny pocket mouse, Heteromys nelsoni EN
 Painted spiny pocket mouse, Heteromys pictus LC
 Salvin's spiny pocket mouse, Heteromys salvini LC
 Jaliscan spiny pocket mouse, Heteromys spectabilis EN
Subfamily: Perognathinae
Genus: Chaetodipus
 Little desert pocket mouse, Chaetodipus arenarius LC
 Narrow-skulled pocket mouse, Chaetodipus artus LC
 Bailey's pocket mouse, Chaetodipus baileyi LC
 California pocket mouse, Chaetodipus californicus LC
 Dalquest's pocket mouse, Chaetodipus dalquesti VU
 Chihuahuan pocket mouse, Chaetodipus eremicus LC
 San Diego pocket mouse, Chaetodipus fallax LC
 Long-tailed pocket mouse, Chaetodipus formosus LC
 Goldman's pocket mouse, Chaetodipus goldmani NT
 Hispid pocket mouse, Chaetodipus hispidus LC
 Rock pocket mouse, Chaetodipus intermedius LC
 Lined pocket mouse, Chaetodipus lineatus DD
 Nelson's pocket mouse, Chaetodipus nelsoni LC
 Desert pocket mouse, Chaetodipus penicillatus LC
 Sinaloan pocket mouse, Chaetodipus pernix LC
 Baja pocket mouse, Chaetodipus rudinoris LC
 Spiny pocket mouse, Chaetodipus spinatus LC
Genus: Perognathus
 Arizona pocket mouse, Perognathus amplus LC
 Plains pocket mouse, Perognathus flavescens LC
 Silky pocket mouse, Perognathus flavus LC
 Little pocket mouse, Perognathus longimembris LC
 Merriam's pocket mouse, Perognathus merriami LC
Suborder: Myomorpha
Family: Cricetidae
Subfamily: Arvicolinae
Genus: Microtus
 California vole, Microtus californicus LC
 Guatemalan vole, Microtus guatemalensis NT
 Mexican vole, Microtus mexicanus LC
 Tarabundí vole, Microtus oaxacensis EN
 Western meadow vole, Microtus drummondii NE extirpated
 Jalapan pine vole, Microtus quasiater NT
 Zempoaltépec vole, Microtus umbrosus EN
Genus: Ondatra
 Muskrat, Ondatra zibethicus LC
Subfamily: Tylomyinae
Genus: Nyctomys
 Sumichrast's vesper rat, Nyctomys sumichrasti LC
Genus: Otonyctomys
 Hatt's vesper rat, Otonyctomys hatti LC
Genus: Ototylomys
 Big-eared climbing rat, Ototylomys phyllotis LC
Genus: Tylomys
 Chiapan climbing rat, Tylomys bullaris CR
 Peters's climbing rat, Tylomys nudicaudus LC
 Tumbala climbing rat, Tylomys tumbalensis CR
Subfamily: Neotominae
Genus: Baiomys
 Southern pygmy mouse, Baiomys musculus LC
 Northern pygmy mouse, Baiomys taylori LC
Genus: Habromys
 Chinanteco deer mouse, Habromys chinanteco CR
 Delicate deer mouse, Habromys delicatulus CR
 Ixtlán deer mouse, Habromys ixtlani CR
 Zempoaltepec deer mouse, Habromys lepturus CR
 Crested-tailed deer mouse, Habromys lophurus NT
 Habromys schmidlyi CR
 Jico deer mouse, Habromys simulatus EN
Genus: Hodomys
 Allen's wood rat, Hodomys alleni LC
Genus: Megadontomys
 Oaxaca giant deer mouse, Megadontomys cryophilus EN
 Nelson's giant deer mouse, Megadontomys nelsoni EN
 Thomas's giant deer mouse, Megadontomys thomasi EN
Genus: Nelsonia
 Goldman's diminutive woodrat, Nelsonia goldmani EN
 Diminutive woodrat, Nelsonia neotomodon NT
Genus: Neotoma
 White-throated woodrat, Neotoma albigula LC
Turner Island woodrat, N. b. varia 
 Tamaulipan woodrat, Neotoma angustapalata EN
 Bryant's woodrat, Neotoma bryanti EN
Anthony's woodrat, N. b. anthonyi EX
Bunker's woodrat, N. b. bunkeri EX
San Martin Island woodrat, N. b. martinensis EX
 Arizona woodrat, Neotoma devia LC
 Dusky-footed woodrat, Neotoma fuscipes LC
 Goldman's woodrat, Neotoma goldmani LC
 Desert woodrat, Neotoma lepida LC
 White-toothed woodrat, Neotoma leucodon LC
 Angel de la Guarda woodrat, Neotoma insularis DD
 Big-eared woodrat, Neotoma macrotis LC
 Mexican woodrat, Neotoma mexicana LC
 Southern plains woodrat, Neotoma micropus LC
 Nelson's woodrat, Neotoma nelsoni CR
 Bolaños woodrat, Neotoma palatina VU
 Sonoran woodrat, Neotoma phenax NT
Genus: Neotomodon
 Mexican volcano mouse, Neotomodon alstoni LC
Genus: Osgoodomys
 Michoacan deer mouse, Osgoodomys banderanus LC
Genus: Peromyscus
 Aztec mouse, Peromyscus aztecus LC
 Orizaba deer mouse, Peromyscus beatae LC
 Brush mouse, Peromyscus boylii LC
 Perote mouse, Peromyscus bullatus CR
 California mouse, Peromyscus californicus LC
 Burt's deer mouse, Peromyscus caniceps CR
 Canyon mouse, Peromyscus crinitus LC
 Dickey's deer mouse, Peromyscus dickeyi CR
 Zacatecan deer mouse, Peromyscus difficilis LC
 Cactus mouse, Peromyscus eremicus LC
 Eva's desert mouse, Peromyscus eva LC
 Northern Baja deer mouse, Peromyscus fraterculus LC
 Blackish deer mouse, Peromyscus furvus DD
 Osgood's mouse, Peromyscus gratus LC
 Angel Island mouse, Peromyscus guardia CR
 Guatemalan deer mouse, Peromyscus guatemalensis LC
 Naked-eared deer mouse, Peromyscus gymnotis LC
 Hooper's mouse, Peromyscus hooperi LC
 Transvolcanic deer mouse, Peromyscus hylocetes LC
 San Lorenzo mouse, Peromyscus interparietalis CR
 White-footed mouse, Peromyscus leucopus LC
 Nimble-footed mouse, Peromyscus levipes LC
 Tres Marias Island mouse, Peromyscus madrensis EN
 Deer mouse, Peromyscus maniculatus LC
 Brown deer mouse, Peromyscus megalops LC
 Puebla deer mouse, Peromyscus mekisturus CR
 Zempoaltepec, Peromyscus melanocarpus EN
 Plateau mouse, Peromyscus melanophrys LC
 Black-eared mouse, Peromyscus melanotis LC
 Black-tailed mouse, Peromyscus melanurus EN
 Mesquite mouse, Peromyscus merriami LC
 Mexican deer mouse, Peromyscus mexicanus LC
 Northern rock mouse, Peromyscus nasutus LC
 El Carrizo deer mouse, Peromyscus ochraventer EN
 White-ankled mouse, Peromyscus pectoralis LC
 Pemberton's deer mouse, Peromyscus pembertoni EX
 Tawny deer mouse, Peromyscus perfulvus LC
 Chihuahuan mouse, Peromyscus polius NT
 False canyon mouse, Peromyscus pseudocrinitus CR
 La Palma field mouse, Peromyscus sagax DD
 Schmidly's deer mouse, Peromyscus schmidlyi LC
 Santa Cruz mouse, Peromyscus sejugis EN
 Nayarit mouse, Peromyscus simulus VU
 Slevin's mouse, Peromyscus slevini CR
 Gleaning mouse, Peromyscus spicilegus LC
 San Esteban Island mouse, Peromyscus stephani CR
 Pinyon mouse, Peromyscus truei LC
 Winkelmann's mouse, Peromyscus winkelmanni EN
 Yucatan deer mouse, Peromyscus yucatanicus LC
 Chiapan deer mouse, Peromyscus zarhynchus VU
Genus: Reithrodontomys
 Baker's small-toothed harvest mouse, Reithrodontomys bakeri EN
 Sonoran harvest mouse, Reithrodontomys burti DD
 Volcano harvest mouse, Reithrodontomys chrysopsis LC
 Fulvous harvest mouse, Reithrodontomys fulvescens LC
 Slender harvest mouse, Reithrodontomys gracilis LC
 Hairy harvest mouse, Reithrodontomys hirsutus VU
 Western harvest mouse, Reithrodontomys megalotis LC
 Mexican harvest mouse, Reithrodontomys mexicanus LC
 Small-toothed harvest mouse, Reithrodontomys microdon LC
 Plains harvest mouse, Reithrodontomys montanus LC
 Cozumel harvest mouse, Reithrodontomys spectabilis CR
 Sumichrast's harvest mouse, Reithrodontomys sumichrasti LC
 Narrow-nosed harvest mouse, Reithrodontomys tenuirostris VU
 Zacatecas harvest mouse, Reithrodontomys zacatecae LC
Genus: Scotinomys
 Alston's brown mouse, Scotinomys teguina LC
Genus: Xenomys
 Magdalena rat, Xenomys nelsoni EN
Subfamily: Sigmodontinae
Genus: Handleyomys
 Alfaro's rice rat, Handleyomys alfaroi LC
 Chapman's rice rat, Handleyomys chapmani LC
 Black-eared rice rat, Handleyomys melanotis LC
 Striped rice rat, Handleyomys rhabdops VU
 Long-nosed rice rat, Handleyomys rostratus LC
 Cloud forest rice rat, Handleyomys saturatior NT
Genus: Oligoryzomys
 Fulvous pygmy rice rat, Oligoryzomys fulvescens LC
Genus: Onychomys
 Chihuahuan grasshopper mouse, Onychomys arenicola LC
 Northern grasshopper mouse, Onychomys leucogaster LC
 Southern grasshopper mouse, Onychomys torridus LC
Genus: Oryzomys
 White-bellied rice rat, Oryzomys albiventer
 Coues' rice rat, Oryzomys couesi LC
 Nelson's rice rat, Oryzomys nelsoni EX
 Marsh rice rat, Oryzomys palustris LC
 Lower California rice rat, Oryzomys peninsulae
Genus: Rheomys
 Mexican water mouse, Rheomys mexicanus EN
 Thomas's water mouse, Rheomys thomasi NT
Genus: Sigmodon
 Allen's cotton rat, Sigmodon alleni VU
 Arizona cotton rat, Sigmodon arizonae LC
 Tawny-bellied cotton rat, Sigmodon fulviventer LC
 Southern cotton rat, Sigmodon hirsutus LC
 Hispid cotton rat, Sigmodon hispidus LC presence uncertain
 White-eared cotton rat, Sigmodon leucotis LC
 Jaliscan cotton rat, Sigmodon mascotensis LC
 Yellow-nosed cotton rat, Sigmodon ochrognathus LC
 Miahuatlán cotton rat, Sigmodon planifrons EN
 Toltec cotton rat, Sigmodon toltecus LC

Order: Lagomorpha (lagomorphs) 

The lagomorphs comprise two families, Leporidae (hares and rabbits), and Ochotonidae (pikas). Though they can resemble rodents, and were classified as a superfamily in that order until the early 20th century, they have since been considered a separate order. They differ from rodents in a number of physical characteristics, such as having four incisors in the upper jaw rather than two. The endangered volcano rabbit of the Trans-Mexican Volcanic Belt is the world's second smallest rabbit. In North America, pikas are not found south of southern California and northern New Mexico.

Family: Leporidae (rabbits, hares)
Genus: Romerolagus
 Volcano rabbit, R. diazi 
Genus: Sylvilagus
 Desert cottontail, S. audubonii 
 Brush rabbit, S. bachmani 
San Jose brush rabbit, S. b. mansuetus 
 Mexican cottontail, S. cunicularius 
 Eastern cottontail, S. floridanus 
Central American tapetí, S. gabbi 
 Tres Marias cottontail, S. graysoni 
 Robust cottontail, S. holzneri  presence uncertain
 Omilteme cottontail, S. insonus 
Genus: Lepus
 Antelope jackrabbit, L. alleni 
 Tamaulipas jackrabbit, L. altamirae 
 Black-tailed jackrabbit, L. californicus 
 White-sided jackrabbit, L. callotis 
 Tehuantepec jackrabbit, L. flavigularis 
 Black jackrabbit, L. insularis

Order: Eulipotyphla (shrews, hedgehogs, moles, and solenodons) 

Eulipotyphlans are insectivorous mammals. Shrews and solenodons closely resemble mice, hedgehogs carry spines, while moles are stout-bodied burrowers. In the Americas, moles are not present south of the northernmost tier of Mexican states, where they are rare.

Family: Soricidae (shrews)
Subfamily: Soricinae
Tribe: Blarinini
Genus: Cryptotis
 Central Mexican broad-clawed shrew, Cryptotis alticola DD
 Goldman's broad-clawed shrew, Cryptotis goldmani LC
 Goodwin's broad-clawed shrew, Cryptotis goodwini LC
 Guatemalan broad-clawed shrew, Cryptotis griseoventris EN
 Big Mexican small-eared shrew, Cryptotis magna VU
 Yucatan small-eared shrew, Cryptotis mayensis LC
 Merriam's small-eared shrew, Cryptotis merriami LC
 Mexican small-eared shrew, Cryptotis mexicana LC
 Nelson's small-eared shrew, Cryptotis nelsoni CR
 Grizzled Mexican small-eared shrew, Cryptotis obscura LC
 North American least shrew, Cryptotis parva LC
 Oaxacan broad-clawed shrew, Cryptotis peregrina DD
 Phillips' small-eared shrew, Cryptotis phillipsii VU
 Tropical small-eared shrew, Cryptotis tropicalis DD
Tribe: Notiosoricini
Genus: Megasorex
 Mexican shrew, Megasorex gigas LC
Genus: Notiosorex
 Cockrum's gray shrew, Notiosorex cockrumi LC
 Crawford's gray shrew, Notiosorex crawfordi LC
 Large-eared gray shrew, Notiosorex evotis LC
 Villa's gray shrew, Notiosorex villai VU
Tribe: Soricini
Genus: Sorex
 Arizona shrew, Sorex arizonae LC
 Zacatecas shrew, Sorex emarginatus LC
 Sorex ixtlanensis DD
 Large-toothed shrew, Sorex macrodon VU
 Sorex mediopua LC
 Carmen Mountain shrew, Sorex milleri VU
 Montane shrew, Sorex monticolus LC
 Mexican long-tailed shrew, Sorex oreopolus LC
 Orizaba long-tailed shrew, Sorex orizabae LC
 Ornate shrew, Sorex ornatus LC
 Saussure's shrew, Sorex saussurei LC
 Sclater's shrew, Sorex sclateri CR
 San Cristobal shrew, Sorex stizodon CR
 Chestnut-bellied shrew, Sorex ventralis LC
 Veracruz shrew, Sorex veraecrucis LC
 Verapaz shrew, Sorex veraepacis LC
Family: Talpidae (moles)
Subfamily: Scalopinae
Tribe: Scalopini
Genus: Scalopus
 Eastern mole, Scalopus aquaticus LC
Genus: Scapanus
 Southern broad-footed mole, Scapanus occultus
 Mexican mole, Scapanus anthonyi

Order: Chiroptera (bats) 

The bats' most distinguishing feature is that their forelimbs are developed as wings, making them the only mammals capable of flight. Bat species account for about 20% of all mammals.

Family: Noctilionidae
Genus: Noctilio
 Lesser bulldog bat, Noctilio albiventris LC
 Greater bulldog bat, Noctilio leporinus LC
Family: Vespertilionidae
Subfamily: Myotinae
Genus: Lasionycteris
 Silver-haired bat, Lasionycteris noctivagans LC
Genus: Myotis
 Silver-tipped myotis, Myotis albescens LC
 Southwestern myotis, Myotis auriculus LC
 California myotis, Myotis californicus LC
 Western small-footed myotis, Myotis ciliolabrum LC
 Elegant myotis, Myotis elegans LC
 Long-eared myotis, Myotis evotis LC
 Findley's myotis, Myotis findleyi EN
 Cinnamon myotis, Myotis fortidens LC
 Hairy-legged myotis, Myotis keaysi LC
 Little brown bat, Myotis lucifugus LC
 Dark-nosed small-footed myotis, Myotis melanorhinus LC
 Black myotis, Myotis nigricans LC
 Arizona myotis, Myotis occultus LC
 Peninsular myotis, Myotis peninsularis EN
 Flat-headed myotis, Myotis planiceps EN
 Fringed myotis, Myotis thysanodes LC
 Cave myotis, Myotis velifer LC
 Fish-eating bat, Myotis vivesi VU
 Long-legged myotis, Myotis volans LC
 Yuma myotis, Myotis yumanensis LC
Subfamily: Vespertilioninae
Genus: Antrozous
 Pallid bat, Antrozous pallidus LC
Genus: Bauerus
 Van Gelder's bat, Bauerus dubiaquercus NT
Genus: Corynorhinus
 Mexican big-eared bat, Corynorhinus mexicanus NT
 Townsend's big-eared bat, Corynorhinus townsendii LC
Genus: Eptesicus
 Brazilian brown bat, Eptesicus brasiliensis LC
 Argentine brown bat, Eptesicus furinalis LC
 Big brown bat, Eptesicus fuscus LC
Genus: Euderma
 Spotted bat, Euderma maculatum LC
Genus: Idionycteris
 Allen's big-eared bat, Idionycteris phyllotis LC
Genus: Lasiurus
 Desert red bat, Lasiurus blossevillii LC
 Eastern red bat, Lasiurus borealis LC
 Hoary bat, Lasiurus cinereus LC
 Southern yellow bat, Lasiurus ega LC
 Northern yellow bat, Lasiurus intermedius LC
 Seminole bat, Lasiurus seminolus LC
 Western yellow bat, Lasiurus xanthinus LC
Genus: Nycticeius
 Evening bat, Nycticeius humeralis LC
Genus: Pipistrellus
 Western pipistrelle, Pipistrellus hesperus LC
 Eastern pipistrelle, Pipistrellus subflavus LC
Genus: Rhogeessa
 Yucatan yellow bat, Rhogeessa aeneus LC
 Allen's yellow bat, Rhogeessa alleni LC
 Genoways's yellow bat, Rhogeessa genowaysi EN
 Slender yellow bat, Rhogeessa gracilis LC
 Least yellow bat, Rhogeessa mira VU
 Little yellow bat, Rhogeessa parvula LC
 Black-winged little yellow bat, Rhogeessa tumida LC
Family: Molossidae
Genus: Cynomops
 Mexican dog-faced bat, Cynomops mexicanus LC
Genus: Eumops
 Black bonneted bat, Eumops auripendulus LC
 Dwarf bonneted bat, Eumops bonariensis LC
 Wagner's bonneted bat, Eumops glaucinus LC
 Sanborn's bonneted bat, Eumops hansae LC
 Western mastiff bat, Eumops perotis LC
 Underwood's bonneted bat, Eumops underwoodi LC
Genus: Molossus
 Aztec mastiff bat, Molossus aztecus LC
 Coiban mastiff bat, Molossus coibensis LC
 Velvety free-tailed bat, Molossus molossus LC
 Miller's mastiff bat, Molossus pretiosus LC
 Black mastiff bat, Molossus rufus LC
 Sinaloan mastiff bat, Molossus sinaloae LC
Genus: Nyctinomops
 Peale's free-tailed bat, Nyctinomops aurispinosus LC
 Pocketed free-tailed bat, Nyctinomops femorosaccus LC
 Broad-eared bat, Nyctinomops laticaudatus LC
 Big free-tailed bat, Nyctinomops macrotis LC
Genus: Promops
 Big crested mastiff bat, Promops centralis LC
Genus: Tadarida
 Mexican free-tailed bat, Tadarida brasiliensis LC
Family: Emballonuridae
Genus: Balantiopteryx
 Thomas's sac-winged bat, Balantiopteryx io VU
 Gray sac-winged bat, Balantiopteryx plicata LC
Genus: Centronycteris
 Thomas's shaggy bat, Centronycteris centralis LC
Genus: Diclidurus
 Northern ghost bat, Diclidurus albus LC
Genus: Peropteryx
 Greater dog-like bat, Peropteryx kappleri LC
 Lesser doglike bat, Peropteryx macrotis LC
Genus: Rhynchonycteris
 Proboscis bat, Rhynchonycteris naso LC
Genus: Saccopteryx
 Greater sac-winged bat, Saccopteryx bilineata LC
 Lesser sac-winged bat, Saccopteryx leptura LC
Family: Mormoopidae
Genus: Mormoops
 Ghost-faced bat, Mormoops megalophylla LC
Genus: Pteronotus
 Davy's naked-backed bat, Pteronotus davyi LC
 Big naked-backed bat, Pteronotus gymnonotus LC
 Parnell's mustached bat, Pteronotus parnellii LC
 Wagner's mustached bat, Pteronotus personatus LC
Family: Phyllostomidae
Subfamily: Phyllostominae
Genus: Chrotopterus
 Big-eared woolly bat, Chrotopterus auritus LC
Genus: Glyphonycteris
 Tricolored big-eared bat, Glyphonycteris sylvestris LC
Genus: Lampronycteris
 Yellow-throated big-eared bat, Lampronycteris brachyotis LC
Genus: Lonchorhina
 Tomes's sword-nosed bat, Lonchorhina aurita LC
Genus: Lophostoma
 Pygmy round-eared bat, Lophostoma brasiliense LC
 Davis's round-eared bat, Lophostoma evotis LC
Genus: Macrophyllum
 Long-legged bat, Macrophyllum macrophyllum LC
Genus: Macrotus
 California leaf-nosed bat, Macrotus californicus LC
 Waterhouse's leaf-nosed bat, Macrotus waterhousii LC
Genus: Micronycteris
 Common big-eared bat, Micronycteris microtis LC
 Schmidts's big-eared bat, Micronycteris schmidtorum LC
Genus: Mimon
 Cozumelan golden bat, Mimon cozumelae LC
 Striped hairy-nosed bat, Mimon crenulatum LC
Genus: Phylloderma
 Pale-faced bat, Phylloderma stenops LC
Genus: Phyllostomus
 Pale spear-nosed bat, Phyllostomus discolor LC
Genus: Tonatia
 Stripe-headed round-eared bat, Tonatia saurophila LC
Genus: Trachops
 Fringe-lipped bat, Trachops cirrhosus LC
Genus: Trinycteris
 Niceforo's big-eared bat, Trinycteris nicefori LC
Genus: Vampyrum
 Spectral bat, Vampyrum spectrum NT
Subfamily: Glossophaginae
Genus: Anoura
 Geoffroy's tailless bat, Anoura geoffroyi LC
Genus: Choeroniscus
 Godman's long-tailed bat, Choeroniscus godmani LC
Genus: Choeronycteris
 Mexican long-tongued bat, Choeronycteris mexicana NT
Genus: Glossophaga
 Commissaris's long-tongued bat, Glossophaga commissarisi LC
 Gray long-tongued bat, Glossophaga leachii LC
 Western long-tongued bat, Glossophaga morenoi LC
 Pallas's long-tongued bat, Glossophaga soricina LC
Genus: Hylonycteris
 Underwood's long-tongued bat, Hylonycteris underwoodi LC
Genus: Leptonycteris
 Greater long-nosed bat, Leptonycteris nivalis EN
 Lesser long-nosed bat, Leptonycteris yerbabuenae VU
Genus: Lichonycteris
 Dark long-tongued bat, Lichonycteris obscura LC
Genus: Musonycteris
 Banana bat, Musonycteris harrisoni VU
Subfamily: Carolliinae
Genus: Carollia
 Seba's short-tailed bat, Carollia perspicillata LC
 Sowell's short-tailed bat, Carollia sowelli LC
 Gray short-tailed bat, Carollia subrufa LC
Subfamily: Stenodermatinae
Genus: Artibeus
 Hairy fruit-eating bat, Artibeus hirsutus LC
 Jamaican fruit bat, Artibeus jamaicensis LC
 Great fruit-eating bat, Artibeus lituratus LC
Genus: Centurio
 Wrinkle-faced bat, Centurio senex LC
Genus: Chiroderma
 Salvin's big-eyed bat, Chiroderma salvini LC
 Hairy big-eyed bat, Chiroderma villosum LC
Genus: Dermanura
 Aztec fruit-eating bat, Dermanura azteca LC
 Pygmy fruit-eating bat, Dermanura phaeotis LC
 Toltec fruit-eating bat, Dermanura tolteca LC
 Thomas's fruit-eating bat, Dermanura watsoni LC
Genus: Enchisthenes
 Velvety fruit-eating bat, Enchisthenes hartii LC
Genus: Platyrrhinus
 Heller's broad-nosed bat, Platyrrhinus helleri LC
Genus: Sturnira
 Little yellow-shouldered bat, Sturnira lilium LC
 Highland yellow-shouldered bat, Sturnira ludovici LC
Genus: Uroderma
 Tent-making bat, Uroderma bilobatum LC
 Brown tent-making bat, Uroderma magnirostrum LC
Genus: Vampyressa
 Northern little yellow-eared bat, Vampyressa thyone LC
Genus: Vampyrodes
 Great stripe-faced bat, Vampyrodes caraccioli LC
Subfamily: Desmodontinae
Genus: Desmodus
 Common vampire bat, Desmodus rotundus LC
Genus: Diaemus
 White-winged vampire bat, Diaemus youngi LC
Genus: Diphylla
 Hairy-legged vampire bat, Diphylla ecaudata LC
Family: Natalidae
Genus: Natalus
 Natalus lanatus LC
 Mexican greater funnel-eared bat, Natalus mexicanus LC
Family: Thyropteridae
Genus: Thyroptera
 Spix's disk-winged bat, Thyroptera tricolor LC

Order: Carnivora (carnivorans) 

There are over 260 species of carnivorans, the majority of which feed primarily on meat. They have a characteristic skull shape and dentition. Mexico has more native mephitids than any other country, with two thirds of extant species being present. Only Costa Rica and Panama have more procyonid species (one more) than Mexico (it is tied with Colombia in this respect). Large extinct carnivorans that lived in the area prior to the coming of humans include the saber-toothed cat Smilodon fatalis, the scimitar cat Homotherium serum, American lions, American cheetahs, dire wolves and short-faced bears.

Suborder: Feliformia
Family: Felidae (cats)
Subfamily: Felinae
Genus: Herpailurus
 Jaguarundi, H. yagouaroundi 
Genus: Leopardus
 Ocelot, L. pardalis 
 Margay, L. wiedii 
Genus: Lynx
 Bobcat, L. rufus 
Genus: Puma
 Cougar, P. concolor 
Subfamily: Pantherinae
Genus: Panthera
 Jaguar, P. onca 
Suborder: Caniformia
Family: Canidae (dogs, foxes)
Genus: Canis
 Coyote, C. latrans 
 Gray wolf, C. lupus  reintroduced
 Mexican wolf, C. l. baileyi reintroduced
Genus: Urocyon
 Gray fox, U. cinereoargenteus 
Genus: Vulpes
 Kit fox, V. macrotis 
Family: Ursidae (bears)
Genus: Ursus
 American black bear, U. americanus 
 Brown bear, U. arctos extirpated
 California grizzly bear, U. a. californicus 
 Mexican grizzly bear, U. a. horribilis 
Family: Mephitidae
Genus: Conepatus
 American hog-nosed skunk, C. leuconotus 
 Striped hog-nosed skunk, C. semistriatus 
Genus: Mephitis
 Hooded skunk, M. macroura 
 Striped skunk, M. mephitis 
Genus: Spilogale
 Southern spotted skunk, S. angustifrons 
 Western spotted skunk, S. gracilis 
 Eastern spotted skunk, S. putorius 
 Pygmy spotted skunk, S. pygmaea 
Family: Mustelidae (mustelids)
Genus: Eira
 Tayra, E. barbara 
Genus: Enhydra
 Sea otter, E. lutris 
Genus: Galictis
 Greater grison, G. vittata 
Genus: Lontra
 North American river otter, L. canadensis  presence uncertain
 Neotropical river otter, L. longicaudis 
Genus: Mustela
 Black-footed ferret, M. nigripes  extirpated
Genus: Neogale
 Long-tailed weasel, N. frenata 
Genus: Taxidea
 American badger, T. taxus 
Family: Procyonidae (raccoons)
Genus: Bassariscus
 Ringtail, B. astutus 
 Cacomistle, B. sumichrasti 
Genus: Nasua
 White-nosed coati, N. narica 
 Cozumel Island coati, N. n. nelsoni
Genus: Potos
 Kinkajou, P. flavus 
Genus: Procyon
 Common raccoon, P. lotor 
 Tres Marias raccoon, P. l. insularis 
 Cozumel raccoon, P. pygmaeus 
Clade Pinnipedia (seals, sea lions and walruses)
Family: Otariidae (eared seals, sea lions)
Genus: Arctocephalus
 Galápagos fur seal, A. galapagoensis  vagrant
 Guadalupe fur seal, A. townsendi 
Genus: Callorhinus
 Northern fur seal, C. ursinus 
Genus: Zalophus
 California sea lion, Z. californianus 
Family: Phocidae (earless seals)
Genus: Mirounga
 Northern elephant seal, M. angustirostris 
Genus: Neomonachus
 Caribbean monk seal, N. tropicalis 
Genus: Phoca
 Harbor seal, P. vitulina

Order: Perissodactyla (odd-toed ungulates) 

The odd-toed ungulates are browsing and grazing mammals. They are usually large to very large, and have relatively simple stomachs and a large middle toe. Tapirids were more widespread before humans appeared, formerly being present in temperate North America as well as the tropical regions they are found in today. Native equids once lived in the region, having evolved in North America over a period of 50 million years, but died out around the time of the first arrival of humans, along with at least one ungulate of South American origin, the notoungulate Mixotoxodon. Sequencing of collagen from a fossil of one recently extinct notoungulate has indicated that this order was closer to the perissodactyls than any extant mammal order.

Family: Tapiridae (tapirs)
Genus: Tapirus
 Baird's tapir, T. bairdii

Order: Artiodactyla (even-toed ungulates and cetaceans) 

The even-toed ungulates are ungulates whose weight is borne about equally by the third and fourth toes, rather than mostly or entirely by the third as in perissodactyls. There are about 220 noncetacean artiodactyl species, including many that are of great economic importance to humans. All of Mexico's extant ungulates are of Nearctic origin. Prior to the arrival of humans, camelids, which evolved in North America, also lived in the region, as did additional antilocaprids (e.g., Capromeryx minor).

Family: Tayassuidae (peccaries)
Genus: Dicotyles
 Collared peccary, D. tajacu 
Genus: Tayassu
 White-lipped peccary, T. pecari 
Family: Cervidae (deer)
Subfamily: Cervinae
Genus: Cervus
 Elk, C. canadensis  extirpated
 Merriam's elk, C. c. merriami 
Subfamily: Capreolinae
Genus: Mazama
 Central American red brocket, M. temama 
Genus: Odocoileus
 Mule deer, O. hemionus 
 Yucatan brown brocket, O. pandora 
 White-tailed deer, O. virginianus 
Family: Antilocapridae (pronghorn)
Genus: Antilocapra
 Pronghorn, A. americana  reintroduced
 Mexican pronghorn, A. a. mexicana 
 Baja California pronghorn, A. a. peninsularis 
 Sonoran pronghorn, A. a. sonoriensis 
Family: Bovidae (cattle, antelope, sheep, goats)
Subfamily: Bovinae
Genus: Bison
 American bison, B. bison  reintroduced
Plains bison, B. b. bison reintroduced
Subfamily: Caprinae
Genus: Ovis
 Bighorn sheep, O. canadensis 
 Desert bighorn sheep, O. c. nelsoni

Order: Cetacea (whales, dolphins and porpoises) 

The order Cetacea includes whales, dolphins and porpoises. They are the mammals most fully adapted to aquatic life with a spindle-shaped nearly hairless body, protected by a thick layer of blubber, and forelimbs and tail modified to provide propulsion underwater. Their closest extant relatives are the hippos, which are artiodactyls, from which cetaceans descended; cetaceans are thus also artiodactyls. Lagoons on the coast of Baja California Sur provide calving grounds for the eastern Pacific population of gray whales. The vaquita of the northern Gulf of California is the world's smallest and most endangered cetacean.

Parvorder: Mysticeti
Family: Balaenopteridae
Subfamily: Balaenopterinae
Genus: Balaenoptera
 Northern minke whale, Balaenoptera acutorostrata LC
 Sei whale, Balaenoptera borealis  EN
 Bryde's whale, Balaenoptera edeni DD critically endangered population in Gulf of Mexico
 Blue whale, Balaenoptera musculus EN
 Fin whale, Balaenoptera physalus
 Northern fin whale, B. p. physalus VU
Subfamily: Megapterinae
Genus: Megaptera
 Humpback whale, Megaptera novaeangliae LC
Family: Eschrichtiidae
Genus: Eschrichtius
 Gray whale, Eschrichtius robustus LC
Family: Balaenidae
Genus: Eubalaena
North Pacific right whale, Eubalaena japonica CR extremely rare
 North Atlantic right whale, Eubalaena glacialis CR possibly seen historically
Parvorder: Odontoceti
Family: Physeteridae (sperm whales) 
Genus: Physeter
 Sperm whale, Physeter macrocephalus VU
Family: Kogiidae
Genus: Kogia
 Pygmy sperm whale, Kogia breviceps DD
 Dwarf sperm whale, Kogia sima DD
Family: Ziphidae
Genus: Ziphius
 Cuvier's beaked whale, Ziphius cavirostris LC
Genus: Berardius
 Baird's beaked whale, Berardius bairdii DD
Subfamily: Hyperoodontinae
Genus: Indopacetus
 Tropical bottlenose whale, Indopacetus pacificus DD
Genus: Mesoplodon
 Blainville's beaked whale, Mesoplodon densirostris DD
 Gervais' beaked whale, Mesoplodon europaeus DD
 Ginkgo-toothed beaked whale, Mesoplodon ginkgodens DD
 Pygmy beaked whale, Mesoplodon peruvianus DD
Superfamily: Delphinoidea
Family: Phocoenidae (porpoises)
Genus: Phocoena
 Vaquita, P. sinus 
Genus: Phocoenoides
 Dall's porpoise, Phocoenoides dalli LC
Family: Delphinidae (marine dolphins)
Genus: Steno
 Rough-toothed dolphin, Steno bredanensis LC
Genus: Tursiops
 Bottlenose dolphin, Tursiops truncatus LC
Genus: Stenella
 Pantropical spotted dolphin, Stenella attenuata LC
 Clymene dolphin, Stenella clymene DD
 Striped dolphin, Stenella coeruleoalba LC
 Atlantic spotted dolphin, Stenella frontalis DD
 Spinner dolphin, Stenella longirostris DD
Genus: Delphinus
 Long-beaked common dolphin, Delphinus capensis DD
 Short-beaked common dolphin, Delphinus delphis LC
Genus: Lagenodelphis
 Fraser's dolphin, Lagenodelphis hosei LC
Genus: Lissodelphis
 Northern right whale dolphin, Lissodelphis borealis LC
Genus: Sagmatias
 Pacific white-sided dolphin, Sagmatias obliquidens LC
Genus: Grampus
 Risso's dolphin, Grampus griseus LC
Genus: Peponocephala
 Melon-headed whale, Peponocephala electra LC
Genus: Feresa
 Pygmy killer whale, Feresa attenuata DD
Genus: Pseudorca
 False killer whale, Pseudorca crassidens DD
Genus: Orcinus
 Orca, Orcinus orca DD
Genus: Globicephala
 Short-finned pilot whale, Globicephala macrorhynchus DD

See also
List of mammals of North America
List of prehistoric mammals
Lists of mammals by region
Mammal classification
List of mammals described in the 2000s

Notes

References

 

Lists of mammals by country

Mammals
Mexico